The Singapore Davis Cup team represents Singapore in Davis Cup tennis competition and are governed by the Singapore Tennis Association.

Singapore currently compete in the Asia/Oceania Zone of Group III.  They have reached the semifinals of Group II in 1988.

Daniel Heryanto is currently the most successful player for Singapore in this competition with a 21-4 win-lose ratio.

History
Singapore competed in its first Davis Cup in 1984.

Current team (2022) 

- Roy Hobbs 

- Shaheed Alam 

- Ethan Lye  

- Michael Jimenez  

Captain : Daniel Heryanto

Davis Cup 2015
Team Singapore emerged victorious in the Davis Cup Asia/Oceania Zone of Group IV held in Bahrain. By being unbeaten, they have achieved qualification in the Davis Cup Asia/Oceania Zone of Group III in 2016

See also
Davis Cup
Singapore Fed Cup team
Hub Tennis Website (Official site of the Davis Cup 2019 in Singapore)

References

External links

Davis Cup teams
Davis Cup
Davis Cup